Dil or DIL may refer to:

Films 
 Dil (1946 film), a Bollywood film
 Dil (1990 film), a Bollywood film
 Dil (2003 film), a Tollywood film

Other uses 
 Dil, Iran, a village in Iran
 DIL (musician), a British-Nigerian singer
 Daughter-in-law
 Debian-Installer Loader
 Deed in lieu
 Defence Industries Limited, a Canadian munitions company
 Dictionary of the Irish Language
 Drug-induced lupus erythematosus, an autoimmune disorder
 Dual in-line package, a type of package for electronic chips
 Presidente Nicolau Lobato International Airport, IATA code DIL

See also 
 DiI, a chemical compound
 Dill (disambiguation)
 Dyl (disambiguation)